The 2018 Big Ten women's basketball tournament was the postseason women's basketball tournament for the Big Ten Conference during the 2017–18 NCAA Division I women's basketball season. It was held from February 28 through March 4, 2018 at Bankers Life Fieldhouse in Indianapolis. Ohio State defeated Maryland 79–69 in the championship game to win the tournament, and received the Big Ten's automatic bid to the 2018 NCAA tournament.

Seeds

All 14 Big Ten schools are participating in the tournament. Teams were seeded by 2017–18 Big Ten Conference season record. The top 10 teams received a first-round bye and the top 4 teams received a double bye.

Seeding for the tournament was determined at the close of the regular conference season:

Schedule

*Game times in Eastern Time. #Rankings denote tournament seeding.

Bracket

 All times are Eastern.

See also

 2018 Big Ten Conference men's basketball tournament

References

Big Ten women's basketball tournament
Tournament
Big Ten women's basketball tournament
Big Ten women's basketball tournament
Big Ten women's basketball tournament
Basketball competitions in Indianapolis
College basketball tournaments in Indiana
Women's sports in Indiana